Bad Omens is an American rock band from Richmond, Virginia formed in 2015 by vocalist, frontman and producer Noah Sebastian, guitarist Nicholas Ruffilo, and bassist Vincent Riquier. The band was later joined by guitarist Joakim "Jolly" Karlsson and drummer Nick Folio, releasing their critically acclaimed debut self-titled album in 2016 under Sumerian Records. Their second full-length album, Finding God Before God Finds Me, was released in 2019. A deluxe edition was released in 2020, spawning singles "Limits" and "Never Know", which both charted on the Billboard Mainstream Rock Songs chart.

History 

The idea to form Bad Omens came in 2013 when Noah Sebastian began secretly making lyrics while also performing guitar duties for a Washington, D.C.-based act named Immoralist. In 2014, Noah Sebastian departed from his former band, with Bad Omens in sight. The following year in 2015, he contacted an old friend, Nicholas Ruffilo, to start the band. He then added another mate, Vincent Riquier, who introduced him to a friend from Sweden, Jolly Karlsson. Karlsson had known Riquier through being touring mates from an old project from Riquier. With those four members, the group moved out of their homes in Sweden and Richmond. Karlsson had the idea to make the move when a friend of his began a small record label that was initially producing the band's songs.  Nick Folio joined after submitting an online cover of a demo the band put out while seeking a drummer. Thus became Bad Omens. The band's name, "Bad Omens", was originally supposed to be the title of one of their early songs, which ended up becoming known as "Glass Houses". The band put out an untitled demo EP containing rough versions of their debut album tracks, which caught the eye of Sumerian Records. The EP was good enough for Sumerian to recommend taking most of the tracks and putting them on a full-length.

After months of rehearsal in Folio's basement, the band set off to Belleville, New Jersey, to record their debut album with producer Will Putney (Upon a Burning Body, The Amity Affliction, Body Count) at Graphic Nature Audio. That very same year in December, the band landed a record deal and released a single and complementary music video for "Glass Houses" through the Sumerian YouTube channel. The single received some attention. A month later, the band released "Exit Wounds". They played on the Sumerian Records 10 Year Tour alongside Born of Osiris, Veil of Maya, After the Burial and Erra. In April 2016, "The Worst in Me" was released, throwing Bad Omens into the limelight with almost one-million streams in a month. This garnered Bad Omens an opening spot on the Ten Years in the Black Tour, a tenth-anniversary Sumerian Records tour headlined by Asking Alexandria, with supporting acts such as Veil of Maya (in certain shows), After the Burial, Upon a Burning Body, I See Stars and Born of Osiris. This tour not only boosted their morale as a band, but also shed light on their debut album that had just been released on August 19, 2016. The album received positive reviews, with Metal Injection rating it an 8.5 out of 10. Many critics compared it to Bring Me the Horizon's Sempiternal release in 2013. Bad Omens' rising fame got them a spot on Warped Tour in 2017, which gave them notice from pop punk fans and metal fans alike. The same year, Noah Sebastian worked with American deathcore act, Winds of Plague on their fifth studio album Blood of My Enemy. The band embarked on what is seemingly their largest tour yet, supporting Parkway Drive on their Reverence tour along with Stick to Your Guns in the spring of 2018. After the tour, the band took time off to finish writing their sophomore album.

Bad Omens was initially scheduled to open up for The Amity Affliction and Senses Fail on their 2019 "Misery Will Find You Tour". However, the band dropped off the lineup on the day the tour was announced. Senses Fail declared the reason they had dropped off was because their logo was too small on the promotional flyer. Bad Omens quickly released a statement clarifying that they left because agreements in the signed contract were not fulfilled, and both bands were now "bullying" the group over their own failure to comply. Bad Omens concurrently released a shirt with their logo in a tiny font to parody the situation.

On December 16, 2019, Bad Omens released a new song, "Never Know", and announced the upcoming deluxe edition of their album, Finding God Before God Finds Me, which featured the same track listing, as well as "Never Know" and two other new songs: "Limits" and a Duran Duran cover of "Come Undone". On January 16, 2020, the band released the music video for the track, "Limits". A day later, they released their cover of "Come Undone".

In February and March 2020, the band embarked on their first full US headlining tour with support from Oh, Sleeper, Thousand Below, and Bloodline. On March 13, the remainder of the tour was indefinitely postponed due to the COVID-19 pandemic.

In 2022, Bad Omens toured with A Day to Remember, The Ghost Inside, and Beartooth. The band later announced on August 23 that they would be headlining a North American tour with Dayseeker, Make Them Suffer, and Thousand Below.

Musical style and influences 
The lyrical content of the band's debut revolves mostly around despair, mental health struggles, and addiction. Noah Sebastian had this to say in an interview with Sumerian about  "The Worst in Me", in particular: It's about a very intense and unhealthy relationship I was in, but we wrote it in a format that's universal to all bad habits. More specifically, it's something you can't let go of even though it's not good for you—whether it's a relationship, a drug problem, or terrible situation. You're addicted. The band have stated numerous times that they have been compared to the early 2010s metalcore style of Bring Me the Horizon. This is due to Noah Sebastian's scratchy, mid-to-high pitch screaming style which bear resemblance to Bring Me the Horizon frontman Oliver Sykes' voice on their 2013 Sempiternal release. The band have addressed these comments as "flattering, yet frustrating". Sebastian also explained that while he may have been influenced by the band, the intent was to sound unique.

Members 

 Noah Sebastian – lead vocals (2015–present) 
 Nicholas Ruffilo – rhythm guitar, programming (2015–present) , bass (2018-present) , lead guitar (2015) 
 Joakim Karlsson – lead guitar, programming, backing vocals (2015–present)
 Nick Folio – drums, percussion (2015–present)

Past members
 Vincent Riquier – bass, backing vocals (2015–2018)

Timeline

Discography

Studio albums

Singles

Music videos

References 

2015 establishments in Virginia
American metalcore musical groups
Heavy metal musical groups from Virginia
Metalcore musical groups from Virginia
Musical groups established in 2015
Musical quartets
Sumerian Records artists